The Sacramento perch (Archoplites interruptus) is an endangered sunfish (family Centrarchidae) native to the Sacramento–San Joaquin River Delta, Pajaro, and Salinas River areas in California, but widely introduced throughout the western United States.

The Sacramento perch's native habitat is in sluggish, heavily vegetated, waters of sloughs and lakes. Its adaptability to different habitats is high, and it can survive on a wide variety of food sources. As young perch, they consume mainly small crustaceans and eventually move on to insect larvae and then smaller fish as adults.

Taxonomy 
Archoplites interruptus belongs to the family Centrarchidae. This family mainly includes species of sunfish. Although called the Sacramento perch, A. interruptus is not a perch strictly speaking; the perches are members of the genus Perca in the family Percidae. This species is also the only member of the centrarchids that resides west of the Rockies.

A. interruptus is currently the only species of genus Archoplites, but Girard had originally assigned it to Centrarchus. The generic name, Archoplites, derives from the Greek άρχος (ruler) and οπλίτης (bearing a shield). Interruptus references the irregular vertical bar markings on the sides of the fish.

Description 
This species is a deep-bodied fish with long dorsal and anal fins. The mouth is large with numerous small teeth found on its jaws, tongue, and roof of its mouth. Its scales are large and brown on the sides and top of the fish and create a metallic greenish-purple shine. The Sacramento perch is most identifiable by its irregular vertical bars. Breeding males and females are slightly sexually dimorphic in color. The males become darker and have purple opercula (hard, bony flap that protects the gills). The color in females is plainer with spotted opercula. Its size is dependent on how old the fish is. A Sacramento perch at age 1 would measure 6–13 cm, at age 2 it would be 12–19 cm, and the growth rate will begin to slow. The largest of this species ever recorded was 61 cm total length.

Distribution 
Historically, the Sacramento perch was found throughout the Central Valley of California at elevations below 100 m. The Sacramento perch was very popular for recreational fishing. It was so abundant that this species was commonly used as a food fish eaten regularly.  It inhabited sloughs, slow-moving rivers of the Pajaro and Salinas rivers, and lakes with emergent vegetation such as Clear Lake. This species has been eliminated from 90% of its natural habitat due to habitat destruction, egg predation by invasive fish species, and interspecific competition. Sacramento perch are quite rare now and found primarily in warm, turbid, and alkaline farm ponds, reservoirs, and recreational lakes that it has been introduced into. There are only two native populations of Sacramento perch that are still maintaining themselves and those reside in Clear Lake and Alameda Creek drainage as well as gravel pit ponds in the Calaveras Reservoir.

Diet 
Aquatic insects are critical to the Sacramento perch's diet. This fish mostly feeds on chironomid midge larvae and pupae found on the bottom or in aquatic plants during winter months. During the summer months, this fish will mostly feed on plankton and other surface organisms. The Sacramento perch is an opportunistic species and will generally prey upon whatever is in abundance and have even been shown to eat mosquito larvae. Smaller perches mostly feed on small crustaceans and as they grow larger move on to aquatic insects and even other fish. This fish is most active at dawn and dusk, but can feed at any time of the day or night.

Breeding pattern 
Spawning occurs from late March through early August, with peak times being late May and Early June when water temperatures are between 18 and 29 °C. The Sacramento perch reaches breeding age at 2–3 years old. The perch gather in shallow waters usually where there are rock piles, submerged roots, or other substrates nearby. The males each defend their own small territories and dig nests for the females to lay their eggs in. These nest areas are vigorously defended from other males by chasing, biting, and flaring opercular flaps at each other. Females spawn by releasing their eggs into the nest followed by the male quickly fertilizing them, but spawning can also occur side by side with sperm and egg being released at the same time. The male cares for the fertilized eggs for several days until they hatch, defending them against predators. When the eggs hatch they are tiny planktonic fish which rise to the surface to feed and grow for a couple weeks before settling down into the vegetation at the bottom.

Relationship with people

Restoration efforts  
The Sacramento perch is a very resilient species of fish with a wide range of diet. It is adapted to withstand low water clarity, high temperatures, even water with high salinity and alkalinity, which is why this native species has been chosen as the primary fish used in aquaponics systems. Aquaponics farms in California are incorporating the use of this endangered species in their systems for growing vegetables. This also serves as a restoration project for breeding Sacramento perch in order to release them back into native waters and add diversity to the wild population. With the rising temperatures in California, the mosquito population has been growing. A study shows that Sacramento perch bred in captivity prefer eating mosquito larvae. These results show that this species has the potential to be used to help control these growing populations in California wetlands. Although populations of Sacramento perch are not as numerous today as they were in the past, many programs today are focusing on reintroducing them across California waterways again. Potential habitats include Putah Creek and Clear Lake, where the Sacramento perch were abundant at one time but due to the construction of heavy infrastructure, could not persist. This species is now being reintroduced upstream of its native habitats in gravel pit ponds. However, due to limited genetic diversity, inbreeding has occurred in these isolated populations. To prevent this, reintroduction programs have been pulling only the most diverse fish from current populations and closely monitoring the diversity of the new populations using genetic markers.

Angling 
The Sacramento perch is considered a game fish; the IGFA all-tackle world record for the species stands at 1.44 kg (3 lb 3 oz) caught from Crowley Lake in California in 1995.

References

External links

Bay Delta Fish You've Never Heard Of: Sacramento Perch; by Chris Clarke; July 9, 2015

Centrarchinae
Endemic fauna of California

Fish described in 1854
Sacramento River
Salinas River (California)
San Joaquin River